Julin is a Nordic surname that may refer to:

Åke Julin (1919–2008), Swedish water polo player
Albert von Julin (1846–1906), Finnish businessman and vuorineuvos
Albert Lindsay von Julin (1871–1944), Finnish engineer, businessman and vuorineuvos, nephew of Albert
Erik Julin (1796–1874), Finnish apothecary, shipowner and industrialist, uncle of Albert
Harald Julin (1890–1967), Swedish swimmer and water polo player, father of Åke and Rolf
Jessica Julin (born 1978), Finnish football player
John von Julin (1787–1853), Finnish pharmacist, factory owner and vuorineuvos, father of Albert and brother of Erik
Magda Julin (1894–1990), Swedish figure skater
Pia Julin (born 1969), Finnish Olympic shooter
Rolf Julin (1918–1997), Swedish water polo player, son of Harald and brother of Åke
Urho Julin (1928–2002), Finnish Olympic runner